The Billboard Tropical Airplay chart is a subchart of the Latin Airplay that ranks the best-performing tropical songs played on Latin radio stations in the United States.

Chart history

References

United States Tropical Songs
2018
2018 in Latin music